The Mfecane (Nguni, Zulu pronunciation: [m̩fɛˈkǀaːne]), also known by the Sesotho names Difaqane or Lifaqane (all meaning "crushing, scattering, forced dispersal, forced migration") is a historical period of heightened military conflict and migration associated with state formation and expansion in Southern Africa. The exact range of dates that comprise the Mfecane varies between sources. At its broadest the period lasted from the late eighteenth century to the mid-nineteenth century, but scholars often focus on an intensive period from the 1810s to the 1840s. The concept first emerged in the 1830s and blamed the disruption on the actions of Shaka Zulu, who was alleged to have waged near-genocidal wars that depopulated the land and sparked a chain reaction of violence as fleeing groups sought to conquer new lands. Since the later half of the 20th century this interpretation has fallen out of favor among scholars due to a lack of historical evidence.

Traditional estimates for the death toll range from 1 million to 2 million, however these numbers are controversial, and some recent scholars revise the mortality figure significantly downward and attributes the root causes to complex political, economic, and environmental developments. The Mfecane is significant in that it saw the formation of new states, institutions, and ethnic identities in Eastern Southern Africa. The Mfecane's historiography itself is also historically significant, with different versions having been employed to serve a range of political purposes since its inception as a historical concept.

Causes
Theories vary as to the causes of the catastrophic warfare and migration of many ethnic groups in the area. Populations had increased greatly in Zululand following the Portuguese introduction of maize from the Americas in the late 17th century, reaching the inland around 1750. While maize was more productive than the grains from native grasses, it required more water during cultivation. The agricultural surpluses and increased population enabled Shaka to field more impis. By the end of the 18th century, the Zulus occupied much of their arable land. Declining rainfall and a ten-year drought in the early 19th century set off a competition for land and water resources among the peoples of the area. Another possible cause is the increased trade of ivory with the Portuguese in the Delagoa Bay. This led to deepening inequality within African societies which led people being even more vulnerable in a region that was already being hit by multiple droughts.

There were three major ethnic groups, the Ngwane, the Ndwandwe and the Mthethwa that occupied the areas now known as Nquthu, Babanango, Empangeni, Mtubatuba, Hlabisa, Nongoma, Pongola, Vryheid, Melmoth and Mahlabathini. They were respectively led by kings Sobhuza of Ngwane, Zwide of Ndwandwe, and Dingiswayo of Mthethwa and were the most powerful ethnic groups. The language now known as Zulu was spoken by the Ndwandwes. At that time, the Zulus were a very weak ethnic group under the leadership of Senzangakhona. These three ethnic groups are to this day found in the same areas. The Zulus were a weak minority occupying a small piece of land in the area now known as Makhosini near Babanango. The Ikhoshlo side of the Buthelezi led by Mvulane became instrumental in the defeat of Phungashe by Shaka. Mvulane's son Ngqengelele became Shaka's induna and chief advisor. Ngqengele's son, Mbangambi led his section of the Buthelezis against Hhamu of Ngenetsheni.

Oral history says that after the death of Mvulane, the younger brother of Phungashe, Mvulane's sons Khoboyela and Ngqengelele escaped being killed by Phungashe over their father Mvulane's estate and went to live with Senzangakhona in the Zulu royal court. Most of the members of the Buthelezi ethnic group had left with Khoboyela and Ngqengelele. When Shaka attacked the Ngwane, Sobhuza's men were outnumbered by the combination of the Mthethwas, the Buthelezis under Ngqengelele and the Zulus. In summary, the causes of mfecane are; the need for land, population growth in Natal, Shaka's military and expansionist strategy.

Rise of the Zulu Kingdom
In about 1817, Chief Dingiswayo of the Mthethwa group in the south near the Tugela River, entered into an alliance with the Tsongas, who controlled the trade routes to Delagoa Bay (now Maputo). This alliance encroached on the routes used by the Ndwandwe alliance, who occupied the region in the north, near the Pongola River. Battles between the allied forces of Chief Dingiswayo and of Chief Zwide, and the Ndwandwe probably mark the start of what became the Mfecane.

Zwide defeated the Mthethwa and executed Chief Dingiswayo. Dingiswayo was a mentor to King Shaka. He took him in together with his mother Queen Nandi and gave them refuge. Many of the Mthethwa leaders formed a confederation with the Zulu clan, under the leadership of Shaka. The Zulus conquered and assimilated smaller clans in the area. Zwide attacked King Shaka and was defeated at the Battle of Gqokli Hill, which marked the start of Shaka's conquest of the Ndwandwe. The Zulu practice was to absorb only the women and young men of a clan or village. They killed the elderly and men of fighting age; the lucky ones escaped. Having learned Zulu tactics, the escapees in turn descended upon more distant clans unfamiliar with the new order.

Consequences for the Nguni Societies

Around 1821, the Zulu general Mzilikazi of the Khumalo clan defied Zulu king Shaka, and set up his own kingdom. He quickly made many enemies: not only the Zulu king, but also the Boers, and the Griqua and Tswana. Defeats in several clashes convinced Mzilikazi to move north towards Swaziland. Going north and then inland westward along the watershed between the Vaal and the Limpopo rivers, Mzilikazi and his followers, the AmaNdebele, (called Matebele in English) established a Ndebele state northwest of the city of Pretoria.

During this period, the Matebele left a trail of destruction in their wake. From 1837 to 1838, the arrival of Boer settlers and the subsequent battles of Vegtkop and Mosega, drove the Matebele north of the Limpopo. They settled in the area now known as Matabeleland, in present-day southern Zimbabwe. Mzilikazi set up his new capital in Bulawayo. The AmaNdebele drove the AmaShona of the region northward and forced them to pay tribute. This caused resentment that has continued to the current day in modern Zimbabwe.

At the Battle of Mhlatuze River in 1818, the Ndwandwe were defeated by a Zulu force under the direct command of Shaka. Soshangane, one of Zwide's generals, fled to Mozambique with the remainder of the Ndwandwe. There, they established the Gaza kingdom. They oppressed the Tsonga people living there, some of whom fled over the Lebombo Mountains into the Northern Transvaal. In 1833, Soshangane invaded various Portuguese settlements, and was initially successful. But a combination of internal disputes and war against the Swazi caused the downfall of the Gaza kingdom.

The Ngwane people lived in present-day Eswatini (Swaziland), where they had settled in the southwest. They warred periodically with the Ndwandwe.

Zwangendaba, a commander of the Ndwandwe army, fled north with Soshangane after his defeat in 1819. Zwangendaba's followers were henceforth called Ngoni. Continuing north of the Zambezi River, they formed a state in the region between lakes Malawi and Tanganyika. Maseko, who led another part of the Ngoni people, founded another state to the east of Zwangendaba's kingdom.

To the east, refugee clans and tribes from the Mfecane fled to the lands of the Xhosa people. Some of them such as the amaNgwane were driven back by force and defeated. Those who were accepted were obliged to be tributary to the Xhosas and lived under their protection. They were assimilated into the Xhosa cultural way of life, becoming part of the Xhosa people. After years of oppression by the Xhosas, they later formed an alliance with the Cape Colony.

Consequences for the Sotho-Tswana peoples

Southern Tswana populations had experienced an increase in conflict as early as the 1780s. There was significant population growth in the region which lead to more competition for resources. There was an increasing amount of trade with the Cape colony and the Portuguese; this had the consequence of separate chiefdoms becoming more eager to conquer land for themselves in order to control trade routes. Dutch settlers from the Cape Colony encroaching upon the Khoikhoi and San into regions where Tswana people live resulted in the formation of the Korana who started to launch raids on other communities by the 1780s. The fact that many of them had access to firearms and horses likely exacerbated the devastation caused by their raiders. Xhosa who were escaping the already violent region of the Eastern Cape often launched their own raids as well. All of these of events led to making the region progressively more unstable. Missionary interference, internal politics, and raids by Dutch settlers also impacted the region. By the start of the 19th century, the most powerful Tswana chiefdom, the Bahurutse, were increasingly being challenged by the Bangwaketse.

Moshoeshoe I gathered the mountain clans together in an alliance against the Zulus. Fortifying the easily defended hills and expanding his reach with cavalry raids, he fought against his enemies with some success, despite not adopting the Zulu tactics, as many clans had done. The territory of Moshoeshoe I became the kingdom of Lesotho.

The Tswana were pillaged by two large invading forces set on the move by the Mfecane. Sebitwane gathered the Kololo ethnic groups near modern Lesotho and wandered north across what is now Botswana, plundering and killing many of the Tswana people in the way. They also took large numbers of captives north with them, finally settling north of the Zambezi River in Barotseland, where they conquered the Lozi people. The next force was the Mzilikazi and the Matebele who moved across Tswana territory in 1837. Both of these invading forces continued to travel north across Tswana territory without establishing any sort of state. In addition to these major kingdoms, a number of smaller groups also moved north into Tswana territory, where they met with defeat and ultimately vanished from history. Among those involved in these invasions were European adventurers such as Nathaniel Isaacs (who was later accused of slave trading).

Controversy 
In 1988, Rhodes University professor Julian Cobbing advanced a different hypothesis on the rise of the Zulu state; he contended the accounts of the Mfecane were a self-serving, constructed product of apartheid-era politicians and historians. According to Cobbing, apartheid-era historians had mischaracterised the Mfecane as a period of internally induced Black-on-Black destruction. Instead, Cobbing argued that the roots of the conflicts laid in the labour needs of Portuguese slave traders operating out of Delagoa Bay, Mozambique and European settlers in the Cape Colony. The resulting pressures led to forced displacement, famine, and war in the interior, allowing waves of Afrikaner settlers to colonize large swaths of the region. Cobbing's views were echoed by historian Dan Wylie, who argued that colonial-era white writers such as Isaacs had exaggerated the brutality of the Mfecane to justify European colonialism.

Cobbing's hypothesis generated an immense volume of polemics among historians; the discussions were termed the "Cobbing Controversy". While historians had already embarked upon new approaches to the study of the Mfecane in the 1970s and 1980s, Cobbing's paper was the first major source that overtly defied the hegemonic "Zulu-centric" explanation at the time. This was followed by fierce discourse in the early 1990s prompted by Cobbing's hypothesis. Many agree that Cobbing's analysis offered several key breakthroughs and insights into the nature of early Zulu society. The historian Elizabeth Eldredge challenged Cobbing's thesis on the grounds that there is scant evidence of the resumption of the Portuguese slave trade out of Delagoa Bay before 1823, a finding that undermines Cobbing's thesis that Shaka's early military activities were a response to slave raids. Moreover, Eldredge argues that the Griqua and other groups (rather than European missionaries as asserted by Cobbing) were primarily responsible for the slave raids coming from the Cape. Eldredge also asserts that Cobbing downplays the importance of the ivory trade in Delagoa Bay, and the extent to which African groups and leaders sought to establish more centralised and complex state formations to control ivory routes and the wealth associated with the trade. She suggests these pressures created internal movements, as well as reactions against European activity, that drove the state formations and concomitant violence and displacement. She still agreed with Cobbing's overall sentiment in that the Zulu-centric explanation for the Mfecane is not reliable. By the early 2000s, a new historical consensus had emerged, recognizing the Mfecane to be not simply a series of events resulting from the founding of the Zulu Kingdom but rather a multitude of factors caused before and after Shaka Zulu came into power.

The debate and controversy within Southern African historiography over the Mfecane has been compared to similar debates about the Beaver Wars of the seventeenth century in northeastern North America, due to the alleged similarity of the narratives of indigenous "self-vanishing" that were propagated by apologists for European colonialism about the Mfecane and the Beaver Wars.

References

Notes

Citations

Further resources

J.D. Omer-Cooper, The Zulu Aftermath: A Nineteenth-Century Revolution in Bantu Africa, Longmans, 1978: 
Norman Etherington, The Great Treks:  The Transformation of Southern Africa, 1815–1854, Longman, 2001: 
Carolyn Hamilton, The Mfecane Aftermath: Reconstructive Debates in Southern African History, Pietermaritzburg: University of Natal Press, 1995: 

19th century in Africa
Genocides in Africa
History of KwaZulu-Natal
Monarchies of South Africa
Zulu culture
Mfecane